Mark Whittow (24 August 1957 – 23 December 2017) was a British historian, archaeologist, and academic, specialising in the Byzantine Empire. He was a university lecturer at the University of Oxford and a Fellow in Byzantine Studies at Corpus Christi College, Oxford.

Early life and education
Whittow was born in Cambridge. He read Modern History at Trinity College, Oxford, and earned a DPhil in Byzantine history and archaeology.

Academic career
Whittow was a research fellow and lecturer at Oriel College and held faculty positions at the University of Reading and at King's College London, before returning to Oxford in 1998 as a fellow of St Peter's College and University Lecturer in History. He became a fellow of Corpus Christi and University Lecturer in Byzantine Studies in 2009. He was Senior Proctor of the university for the 2016/2017 academic year. In November 2017, he was announced as the next Provost of Oriel College, Oxford; he was to take up the post in September 2018.

Personal life
Whittow was married to Helen, a QC and Deputy High Court Judge.

He died in a car accident in Oxfordshire late in the evening of 23 December 2017 aged 60.

Selected works
 
"Recent Research on the Late Antique City in Asia Minor: the second half of the 6th c. revisited" in L. Lavan (ed.) Recent Research in Late Antique Urbanism, JRA Supplementary Series 42, Portsmouth, RI, 2001. 
"Early Medieval Byzantium and the End of the Ancient World", Journal of Agrarian Change, Vol. 9 (2009).
"The Middle Byzantine Economy", in J. Shepard (ed.) The Cambridge History of the Byzantine Empire, Cambridge, 2009.
"The Late Roman/Early Byzantine Near East", in The New Cambridge History of Islam I, ed. C. Robinson, Cambridge, 2010.

References

External links 
Academia.edu profile
Full text of doctoral thesis via Oxford Research Archive

1957 births
2017 deaths
Fellows of Corpus Christi College, Oxford
British archaeologists
British Byzantinists
Road incident deaths in England
Scholars of Byzantine history
Byzantine archaeologists
People from Cambridge
Travelers in Asia Minor